Ubet is an unincorporated community in the town of Garfield in Polk County, Wisconsin, United States.

Ubet has been noted for its unusual place name.

References

Unincorporated communities in Polk County, Wisconsin
Unincorporated communities in Wisconsin